If You Knew Susie is a 1948 American comedy film directed by Gordon Douglas and written by Warren Wilson, Oscar Brodney, Bud Pearson and Lester A. White. The film was produced by, and starred, Eddie Cantor in his final starring role in a feature film.  The film also stars Joan Davis, Allyn Joslyn, Charles Dingle and Bobby Driscoll. The film was released on February 7, 1948, by RKO Pictures.

Plot
Sam and Susie Parker, a husband and wife team of vaudeville performers retire and return to Sam's ancestral historic New England home to be with their children.  The pair turn their 17th century home into a hotel with entertainment that turns the community against them.  Sam and Susie's son Junior faces bullying and ridicule because his ancestor was "America's First Draft Dodger" in the American War of Independence. The town boycott of the Parker's inn forces Sam and Susie to sell their home and auction off the family's antique furniture.   When moving a cabinet, a recess in the wall is discovered that contains a letter to Sam's ancestor from George Washington thanking him for his services as a blockade runner that brought needed munitions to the Continental Army.  An additional part of the letter is illegible.

The pair travel to Washington D.C. to investigate whether the document is genuine.  The National Archives not only prove that it is, but they possess a misfiled but genuine identical copy with the illegible portion of Sam's copy declaring the new American government will pay Sam's ancestor or his descendants £10,000 with compounded interest for the munitions giving the Parkers seven billion modern dollars that attract the attention of the media and criminals.

Cast 
Eddie Cantor as Sam Parker
Joan Davis as Susie Parker
Allyn Joslyn as Mike Garrett
Charles Dingle as Mr. Whitley
Bobby Driscoll as Junior 
Phil Brown as Joe Collins
Sheldon Leonard as	 Steve Garland
Joe Sawyer as Zero Zantini
Douglas Fowley as Marty
Margaret Kerry as Marjorie Parker
Dickie Humphreys as Handy Clinton 
Howard Freeman as Mr. Clinton
Mabel Paige as Grandma
Sig Ruman as Count Alexis
Fritz Feld as Chez Henri
Isabel Randolph as Mrs. Clinton
Kay Christopher as the Telephone Operator

Reception
The film recorded a loss of $490,000.

Soundtrack
If You Knew Susie
Music by Joseph Meyer 
Lyrics by Buddy G. DeSylva  
Sung by Eddie Cantor  
What Do I Want with Money
Music by Jimmy McHugh 
Lyrics by Harold Adamson
Performed by Eddie Cantor and Joan Davis 
My, How the Time Goes ByMusic by Jimmy McHugh 
Lyrics by Harold Adamson 
Performed by Eddie Cantor and Joan Davis My Brooklyn Love SongMusic and Lyrics by George Tibbles and Ramey Idriss 
Sung and Danced by Margaret Kerry and Dickie Humphreys  Auld Lang SyneTraditional Scottish 17th century music 
Lyrics by Robert Burns Lucia Sextet(1835) from "Lucia di Lammermoor" 
Music by Gaetano Donizetti 
Libretto by Salvatore Cammarano  
Performed by Eddie Cantor, Joan Davis, George Murphy and Constance Moore from the film Show Business''

References

External links 
 

1948 comedy films
1948 films
American black-and-white films
American comedy films
Films directed by Gordon Douglas
RKO Pictures films
1940s English-language films
1940s American films